Konya is a city in Turkey.

Konya may also refer to one of the following

 Konya (TV series), a Bengali language Indian soap opera
Konya Province, Ottoman Empire (Konya vilayet)
Konya Province, Turkey
Sándor Kónya, Hungarian operatic tenor